SS Dalfram (1930-1943) was a  British Cargo Steamer of 4,558 tons built in 1930 by Scotts Shipbuilding and Engineering Company, Greenock for Campbell Brothers and Co, Newcastle upon Tyne. The ship was launched on 2 April 1930.

The vessel is best known for its part in the Dalfram dispute of 1938 at Port Kembla in Australia while contracted by Japanese company Mitsui to carry a cargo of pig iron to the steel works in Kobe, Japan. The ten-week dispute earned Australian Attorney General (later Prime Minister) Robert Menzies the nickname of "Pig Iron Bob" when he attempted to force the workers to load the cargo.

On 2 May 1942 the Dalfram had a narrow escape when she struck a mine laid by German ship Doggerbank, a British built ship captured by the Germans and then used as an auxiliary minelayer. Dalfram, after hitting the mine, was able to return to Cape Town under her own power for repairs.

Dalfram, carrying a load of coal, was sunk on 4 August 1943 with three of her 43 crew lost, when en route from Lourenco Marques and Durban for Aden and Alexandria via Mauritius.  The ship was torpedoed by German submarine U-181 and sunk east of Madagascar.

The crew of Dalfram abandoned ship taking to the lifeboats. They were picked up by the German U-boat and questioned for eight days, before being landed on the island of Île Sainte-Marie, east of Madagascar.

References

1930 ships
Ships built on the River Clyde
Maritime incidents in August 1943
World War II shipwrecks in the Indian Ocean
Ships sunk by German submarines in World War II